The 1989 New York Jets season was the 30th season for the franchise and the 20th in the National Football League. It began with the team trying to improve upon its 8–7–1 record from 1988 under head coach Joe Walton, hoping to return to the playoffs for the first time since 1986.

Instead, the Jets finished the season with a record of 4–12, their worst since 1980. They lost six of their first seven games to start the year and finished with three consecutive losses, two of which were shutouts. Their last place finish in the AFC East, combined with fan discontent at the Jets’ play, led to Walton’s firing at the end of the season.

Offseason

NFL Draft

Personnel

Staff/Coaches

Roster

Regular season

Schedule

Standings

Milestones 
 Ken O'Brien had his third season with at least 3,000 yards passing.

References

External links 
 1989 statistics

New York Jets seasons
New York Jets
New York Jets season
20th century in East Rutherford, New Jersey
Meadowlands Sports Complex